Vivian Airport  is a town-owned public-use airport located two nautical miles (3.7 km) southwest of the central business district of Vivian, a town in Caddo Parish, Louisiana, United States. The airport is 25 miles north of Shreveport, Louisiana and it is also known as Vivian Municipal Airport.

Facilities and aircraft 
It has one asphalt paved runway designated 9/27 which measures 2,998 by 75 feet (914 x 23 m).

For the 12-month period ending May 20, 2008, the airport had 8,500 general aviation aircraft operations, an average of 23 per day. At that time there were 9 aircraft based at this airport: 6 single-engine, 1 multi-engine, 1 jet and 1 ultralight.

References

External links 
 
 

Airports in Louisiana
Buildings and structures in Caddo Parish, Louisiana
Transportation in Caddo Parish, Louisiana